Calamus gibbsianus is a species of rattan palm in the genus Calamus endemic to the Malaysian States of Sarawak and Sabah on the island of Borneo.

References

gibbsianus
Endemic flora of Borneo
Trees of Borneo
Plants described in 1913
Taxa named by Odoardo Beccari